HMS H52 was a British H class submarine built by HM Dockyard, Pembroke Dock. She was laid down on an unknown date, launched on 31 March 1919 and commissioned on 16 December 1919, the last Welsh-built fighting ship to enter the British Royal Navy.

HMS H52 was sold on 9 November 1927.

Design

H52 was fitted with an anti-aircraft gun and four  torpedo tubes. Its torpedo tubes were fitted to the bows and the submarine was loaded with eight  torpedoes. It is a Holland 602 type submarine but was designed to meet Royal Navy specifications. Its complement was twenty-two crew members.

References

Bibliography
 

 
 

 

British H-class submarines
Ships built in Pembroke Dock
1919 ships
Royal Navy ship names